

Club history 

Launceston United Soccer Club, is a semi-professional soccer club which represents the city of Launceston in the Northern Championship (Tasmania). It should not be mistaken with the fellow Launceston team, Launceston City. The club fields teams in all junior NTJSA (Northern Tasmanian Junior Soccer Association) divisions. The senior club consists of the Senior Men's Northern Championship team (first team), Women's Super League Team, Men's Northern Championship League 1 reserve team, Men's Northern Championship Under 18's team, Northern Championship League 2 team (social League) as well as women's teams.

The club has over 800 registered players in senior and junior competitions.

Launceston United play their home games at Birch Avenue, in Launceston, Tasmania. The club's home ground is named after the street name where the ground is located in suburb of Newstead. The Birch Avenue grounds feature two full-size FIFA playing fields and floodlights for night matches and training sessions.

Launceston United Soccer Club was formed in 1958 and merged with "Launceston Matric" under the name of "Launceston Soccer & Sports Club" in 1989.
Matric was promoted to the Tasmanian State League from the Northern Premier League for the 1988 season, and Merged with Launceston United the following season.  However, they only lasted two seasons in the top flight before withdrawing in 1990 back to the Northern Premier League.
Launceston United reverted to their original name in 2008.

The home playing kit of Launceston United is Royal Blue and White, and the away kit is either green or white. The home kit is very distinctive and features a Royal Blue jersey, the home kit also features Royal Blue shorts and Royal Blue socks. The away kits are either alternatively Green or Red.

For sponsorship reasons, the Senior Men's home and away kits are sponsored by Bridges Personal Investment services and Wayne Manion plumbing services. The WSL Women's Team is sponsored by Launceston Floorworld, Australian Flooring Supplies and Airstep. All senior kits are manufactured and designed by Covo Australia.

The club theme song is 'Boys/Girls of Launnie' and is sung by the club's senior team's in the change rooms after a victory.

The club motto is Esse Quam Videri, which is a Latin phrase meaning "To be, rather than to seem".

Women's Super League 
In 2020 Launceston United SC won the bid to enter into the statewide Women's Super League, after the majority of the squad won the 2020 Women's Northern Championship League title with the club. 

As of 2021 the inaugural Launceston United SC WSL Squad consists of:
 Katie Hill (C)
 Dani Gunton (VC)
 Nichola Clark
 Laura Dickinson
 Madi Gilpin
 Jess Robinson
 Jess McCullum-smith
 Abigail Thomas
 Amy Littlechild
 Annika Reitsema
 Elodie Gray
 Gonya Luate
 Imogen Mccormick (GK)
 Isabella Duff
 Isobel Cootes
 Karla Jones
 Madeline Lohse
 Sofie Verhaegen
 Sydney Carnie (GK)
 Tahlia Vanderheide
 Tess Klower

New clubrooms 
On Saturday, 1 August 2015, Club President Tony Pearce and Michael Ferguson MHA officially opened the new Launceston United clubrooms. The opening was the culmination of a seven-year journey of development applications with the Launceston City Council, grants applications with the Tasmanian Government's Sports and Recreation Department, Football Federation Australia (FFA) and many club fundraising events. The club needed to replace the older, out of date existing clubroom building that had been in service since 1965, to more modern facilities. The new clubrooms feature four changing rooms catering for home and away teams, two separate player shower and toilet block facilities adjacent to the change rooms, referee room, club house facilities for functions, and a fully serviced bar and canteen.

Michael and Tony jointly opened the state of the art building for the present and future generations of the Launceston United Soccer Club and the community of Launceston. The new clubrooms are among the best soccer facilities in Tasmania and adequately reflect the size of the club, being the largest in Tasmania with over 800 players.

Current Senior Men's Squad 
 Aidan Rigby (C)
 Aaron Gunsar
 Americo Arguelles
 Andrew Smith
 Casey Summers
 Christian Byard
 Christopher Pickering
 Connor Reading
 Greg Duffy (GK)
 Jarrod Grossman 
 Mitch Lockhart
 Oliver Jacobs
 Oscar Scharapow (GK)
 Reede Beckett
 Samuel Lowe (VC)
 Samuel Quinn
 Sebastian Gardiner
 Thomas Doonan
 Tom Mctigue
 Will Spicer
 Yousef Mohammad

2016 Northern Championship Senior men's first team pictured above

Notable Past Players and Coaches 
 Brad Green
 Ken Morton

Seasons

Honours 
State Championships: Once (1967)
State Championships Runners-up: Once (1964)
Northern Premierships: 2 Times (1964, 1993)
Steve Hudson Cup 2 times (1995, 2015)

References

External links
Official website

Association football clubs established in 1958
Soccer clubs in Tasmania
1958 establishments in Australia
Sport in Launceston, Tasmania